Achin is a district in southern Nangarhar Province, Afghanistan, on the border with Pakistan.

Its population is 100% Pashtun. Achin is home to the Shinwari tribe, one of the largest Pashtun tribes.

It was a stronghold of the Mujaheddin during the Soviet occupation of Afghanistan in the 1980s. Since 2015 it has been the stronghold of the Afghan branch of ISIL.

During the April 2017 Nangarhar airstrike, the United States Air Force dropped a MOAB in Achin district which targeted a tunnel complex of the ISIS-affiliate located in the area, and reportedly killed dozens of militants.

Economy
The primary licit crop in Achin is wheat.  Collecting and selling firewood, and manual labor, are other income-generating activities.  Tobacco is also grown in the district.

Opium poppy
In 2000, UNDCP recorded 130 poppy-growing villages in Achin, making it the greatest opium growing district in eastern Afghanistan that year.

References

External links
Map of Achin (PDF)
UNODC 2003 Opium Survey (extensive photographs of Achin poppy cultivation)

Districts of Nangarhar Province
Districts of Afghanistan